Salih Mustafa also known by the nickname  "Cali", (born 1 January 1972) is a former Kosovo Liberation Army (KLA) war commander from the Guerilla BIA unit, the former intelligence chief of the Kosovo Security Force (KSF). In 2022, he was convicted of war crimes in Kosovo Special Court and sentenced to 26 years imprisonment.

Early life and education
Mustafa was born on 1 January 1972 in the city of Pristina in Kosovo, then part of Yugoslavia. He completed studies in economics and following the end of the Kosovo War, he served as an adviser in the Kosovar Ministry of Defence.

Kosovo War
During the Kosovo War, Mustafa served with the KLA as a commander of a guerilla unit operating in the Llap region of Kosovo. In 2021, Mustafa was charged for war crimes for acts committed against Kosovo Albanian civilians detained in the detention compound in Zllash in April 1999.

Trial and conviction
Mustafa was indicted for war crimes by the Kosovo Specialist Chambers. The indictment charged Mustafa with "arbitrary detention … cruel treatment … torture … and murder" of civilians in 1999, in particular ordering prisoners to be tortured at an internment camp in Zllash/Zlas. Mustafa's trial began on 15 September 2021 and was the first heard by the Kosovo Specialist Chambers. Prosecutors said that witnesses would testify at the trial that Mustafa had tortured them or had ordered their torture.

In December 2022 he was convicted of the war crimes of arbitrary detention, torture, and murder, but not convicted of cruel treatment. He was sentenced to 26 years in prison. 

The verdict and sentence were criticized by some Kosovan Albanians.

References

1970s births
Living people
Kosovo Liberation Army soldiers
People indicted by the Kosovo Specialist Chambers
Date of birth missing (living people)
Place of birth missing (living people)
Kosovan people convicted of international crimes
War crimes in the Kosovo War